Christian Bérard  (20 August 1902 – 11 February 1949), also known as Bebè, was a French artist, fashion illustrator and designer.

Bérard and his lover Boris Kochno, who worked for the Ballets Russes and was also co-founder of the Ballets des Champs-Elysées, were one of the most prominent openly homosexual couples in French theater during the 1930s and 1940s.

Early life
Born in Paris in 1902, Bérard studied at the Lycée Janson de Sailly as a child. In 1920, he entered the Academie Ranson, where his style was influenced by Édouard Vuillard and Maurice Denis.

Career
Bérard showed his first exhibition in 1925, at the Gallery Pierre. From the start of his career he had an interest in theatrical scenery and costume designs, and played an important role in the development of theatrical design in the 1930s and 1940s. In the early 1930s Bérard worked with Jean-Michel Frank, painting screens, wood-work and drawing projects for carpets. He also worked as a fashion illustrator for Coco Chanel, Elsa Schiaparelli, and Nina Ricci. Bérard's most renowned achievement was probably his lustrous, magical designs for Jean Cocteau's film La Belle et la Bête (1946).

Bérard died suddenly from a heart attack on 11 February 1949, on the stage of the Théâtre Marigny. Francis Poulenc's Stabat Mater (1950) was composed in his memory, and Jean Cocteau dedicated his film Orphée (1950) to him.

References

External links

Christian Berard - The French artist who epitomised eccentric glamour

1902 births
1949 deaths
Painters from Paris
Donaldson Award winners
French illustrators
Fashion illustrators
20th-century French painters
20th-century French male artists
French male painters
French gay artists
Ballets Russes and descendants
Gay painters
French LGBT painters
Burials at Père Lachaise Cemetery
20th-century French LGBT people